MYTEEN (short for Make Your Teenager) was a South Korean boy band formed by The Music Works in 2016 and debuted in 2017 with the release of their first extended play titled MYTEEN GO!. At the time of their disbandment, the group consisted of six members: Chunjin, Eunsu, Kim Kookheon, Shin Junseop, Song Yuvin, and Hanseul. Member Lee Taevin departed from the group on December 30, 2018. MYTEEN disbanded on August 21, 2019.

History

Pre-debut
Song Yuvin competed in the singing competition show Superstar K6 in 2014, where he finished in TOP4. He later signed The Music Works and debuted as a soloist with releasing digital single "To The Bone It's You" featuring BtoB's Minhyuk on May 30, 2016. Later that month, The Music Works also announced that Song Yuvin would debut with an upcoming boy group in the first half of 2017 named MYTEEN. The group's name is a portmanteau of words "MY" and "TEENAGER" and reportedly meant that the group would be composed of idols who are vibrant and bright as teenagers. The Music Works later introduced seven members: Lee Taevin, Chunjin, Eunsu, Kim Kookheon, Shin Junseop, Hanseul with Song Yuvin on Baek Ji-young's nationwide concert Andante in Busan on August 27 with performed their upcoming track "Amazing".

To further promote their group, MYTEEN performed at selected middle and high schools in each region of South Korea as part of their Follow MYTEEN tour between October and November 2016. In January 2017, they held their first international fan meeting at Hong Kong and had their first reality show Trainee Escape Project - Myteen Go! aired on MBC Music.

2017: Debut with MYTEEN GO! and MIXNINE
The group made their official debut on July 26 with the release of their first EP titled MYTEEN GO!. The EP contains seven tracks with the title track "Amazing". Their debut showcase was held at the Ilchi Art Hall on the same day as the album's release. They made their official debut stage on the music program M Countdown on the next day.

In October 2017, four members (Chunjin, Eunsu, Kookheon and Junseop) participated on the survival show MIXNINE, where only three members (Chunjin, Kookheon and Junseop) passed the auditions and made it into the Top 170. Chunjin and Junseop were eliminated in episodes 7 and 10 respectively while Kookheon made it into the finale but did not make the final cut.

2018: F;UZZLE, Japanese debut and Taevin's departure 
MYTEEN released their second EP F;UZZLE on July 10, 2018, with a total of seven tracks including the lead single "She Bad". They also held comeback showcase at the Ilchi Art Hall on the same day as the album's release.

MYTEEN debuted in Japan with their first Japanese single album SHE BAD (Japanese ver.) on October 24, 2018.

On December 30, 2018. The Music Works officially confirmed Taevin's departure from the group. He decided to focus on his acting career.

2019: Produce X 101 Participation and disbandment 
Kookheon and Yuvin have participated as the contestants in Produce X 101. On March 15, they were revealed as the candidates for the center of Produce X 101's title song "X1-MA". On Episode 11, Kookheon was eliminated on the show, losing to iMe Korea's Lee Se-jin for the 20th and final place and thus did not make the finals. Yuvin placed 17th on Episode 11, and advanced to the finals, but finished in 16th place and did not make the debut lineup. On August 21, it was announced via Eunsu's Instagram that MYTEEN would disband. The Music Works released a statement on their official site about the disbandment of the group after two years of activity.

Members

Former 
 Lee Tae-vin
 Chunjin
 Choi Eun-su (최)
 Kim Kook-heon
 Shin Jun-seop
 Song Yu-vin
 Hanseul

Discography

Extended plays

Singles

Filmography

Reality shows

Awards and nominations

Korea Marketing Awards

|-
| 2018
| MYTEEN
| 내일의 스타 (Tomorrow's Star) Award
|

Notes

References

External links

K-pop music groups
Musical groups established in 2017
South Korean boy bands
South Korean dance music groups
South Korean pop music groups
Musical groups from Seoul
2017 establishments in South Korea